Mary Chind-Willie (born May 29, 1967) is a Pulitzer Prize winning photographer.

Biography
Chind-Willie was born in Stevens Point, Wisconsin. She is a 1989 graduate of the University of Wisconsin-Stevens Point, where she received her Bachelor of Fine Arts with a concentration in graphic design and communications. Currently, she lives in an in Altoona, Iowa with her husband, Troy Willie.

Career
Chind-Willie is an independent photographer working in Iowa. In 1999 she joined the Des Moines Register where she worked until 2014. Previously Chind-Willie has worked for The Sierra Vista Herald as well as The Tucson Citizen.

Awards
While working for the Des Moines Register, Chind-Willie won the 2010 Pulitzer Prize for Breaking News Photography for a photo showing a construction worker, Jason Oglesbee, attempting to rescue Patricia Ralph-Neely from a flooded river. The Pulitzer Prizes described the photograph as "the heart stopping moment when a rescuer dangling in a makeshift harness tries to save a woman trapped in the foaming water beneath a dam." Attempts to rescue the woman, trapped in the turbulence of water churning underneath a dam had been futile, so Oglesbee wrapped himself in chains and had a construction crane lower him to within reach of the woman. In the photograph, you don't see the woman, but simply her outstretched hand. Ultimately, she was saved.

References

External links

1967 births
Living people
American photojournalists
Pulitzer Prize for Photography winners 
American women journalists
People from Stevens Point, Wisconsin
People from Altoona, Iowa
Photographers from Wisconsin
Photographers from Iowa
Journalists from Wisconsin
Journalists from Iowa
20th-century American photographers
20th-century American journalists
21st-century American photographers
21st-century American journalists
University of Wisconsin–Stevens Point alumni
20th-century American women photographers
21st-century American women photographers
Women photojournalists